Geophilus admarinus is a species of soil centipede in the family Geophilidae. It's found in southeast Alaska under stones near the low tide mark and is capable of surviving prolonged submersion underwater.

Description
G. admarinus grows to about 25 millimeters in length and has around 47 leg pairs. It's characterized by a head longer than it is wide; first maxillae with palpus and inner process both conically pointed and each having typically 5 setae on its ventral face; smooth claws of the second maxillae; concave labrum; median division straight or slightly concave, bearing 5 long, basally dark teeth, and lateral division pectinate; syncoxite bearing a lappet on each side; coxae broadly united with no trace of a median suture; unarmed prosternum of poison claws with an absence of chitin lines and minute teeth at the base; and an absence of ventral pores.

References 

admarinus
Animals described in 1952